Sackbayeme is a rural city in Cameroon. °The city's co-ordinates are 48° 21'S 34°12'W .

The gynaecologist, Ernestine Gwet Bell, who supervised the successful birth of Cameroon's first IVF baby, was born there.

References 

Populated places in Centre Region (Cameroon)